The Washington State Office of the Insurance Commissioner was created in 1889–90, and became a separate agency in 1907 with an elected commissioner. The current commissioner is Mike Kreidler, a Democrat first elected in 2000 and reelected five times.

In 2014, a bill was introduced to replace the elected commissioner with a 10-person board which would hire the commissioner. It was passed in both houses but vetoed by Governor Jay Inslee.

In 2015, the office denied applications by a number of association health plans, resulting in a legal dispute with those affected.

Insurance Commissioners

References

External links 
 Washington State Office of the Insurance Commissioner
 Washington State Office of the Insurance Commissioner consumer-focused blog

State agencies of Washington (state)